The Mark 77 bomb (MK-77) is a United States  air-dropped incendiary bomb carrying  of a fuel gel mix which is the direct successor to napalm.

The MK-77 is the primary incendiary weapon currently in use by the United States military. Instead of the gasoline, polystyrene, and benzene mixture used in napalm bombs, the MK-77 uses kerosene-based fuel with a lower concentration of benzene. The Pentagon has claimed that the MK-77 has less impact on the environment than napalm. The mixture reportedly also contains an oxidizing agent, making it more difficult to put out once ignited, as well as white phosphorus.

The effects of MK-77 bombs are similar to those of napalm. The official designation of Vietnam War-era napalm bombs was the Mark 47.

Use of aerial incendiary bombs against civilian populations, including against military targets in civilian areas, was banned in the 1980 United Nations Convention on Certain Conventional Weapons Protocol III. However the United States reserved the right to use incendiary weapons against military objectives located in concentrations of civilians where it is judged that such use would cause fewer casualties and/or less collateral damage than alternative weapons.

Use in Iraq and Afghanistan
MK-77s were used by the United States Marine Corps during Operation Desert Storm and Operation Iraqi Freedom. Approximately 500 were dropped, reportedly mostly on Iraqi-constructed oil filled trenches. They were also used at the Battle of Tora Bora during the Afghan War.

At least thirty MK-77s were also used by Marine Corps aviators over a three-day period during the 2003 invasion of Iraq, according to a June 2005 letter from the UK Ministry of Defence to former Labour MP Alice Mahon. This letter stated:

The U.S. destroyed its remaining Vietnam era napalm in 2001 but, according to the reports for I Marine Expeditionary Force (I MEF) serving in Iraq in 2003, they used a total of 30 MK 77 weapons in Iraq between 31 March and 2 April 2003, against military targets away from civilian areas. The MK 77 firebomb does not have the same composition as napalm, although it has similar destructive characteristics. The Pentagon has told us that owing to the limited accuracy of the MK 77, it is not generally used in urban terrain or in areas where civilians are congregated.

This confirmed previous reports by U.S. Marine pilots and their commanders saying they had used Mark 77 firebombs on military targets:

According to the Italian public service broadcaster RAI's documentary Fallujah, The Hidden Massacre, the MK 77 had been used in Baghdad in 2003 in civilian-populated areas. However, Marine pilots stated to the San Diego Union-Tribune that the targets of the bombings were Iraqi soldiers defending civilian infrastructure such as bridges, as opposed to targeting civilians directly.

In some cases where journalists reported that the U.S. military has used napalm, military spokesmen denied the use of "napalm" without making it clear that MK-77 bombs had actually been deployed instead.

U.S. officials incorrectly informed U.K. Ministry of Defence officials that MK-77s had not been used by the U.S. in Iraq, leading to Defence Minister Adam Ingram making inaccurate statements to the U.K. Parliament in January 2005. Later both Adam Ingram and Secretary of State for Defence John Reid apologized for these inaccurate statements being made to Members of Parliament.

Variants

 Mk 77 Mod 2
 Mk 77 Mod 3
No longer in service.
No longer in service.

See also
 Mark 81 bomb
 Mark 82 bomb
 Mark 83 bomb
 Mark 84 bomb
 Mark 117 bomb
 Mark 118 bomb

References

Endnotes
 MK-77 Dumb Bombs, Federation of American Scientists
 
 Army Regulations 600-8-27 dated 2006

External links
 'Dead bodies are everywhere', Sydney Morning Herald, 22 March 2003 - probably the first published report on Mk 77 use in Iraq
 Napalm by another name: Pentagon denial goes up in flames, Sydney Morning Herald, 9 August 2003
 US State Department Response to Illegal Weapon Allegations, 27 January 2005
 US lied to Britain over use of napalm in Iraq war, The Independent, 17 June 2005
 Parliament misled over firebomb use, Daily Telegraph, 20 June 2005
 The Hidden Massacre by Sigfrido Ranucci, Video documentary shows actual chemical bombing on civilians in Fallujah with testimony of interviewed U.S. soldiers - English, Italian and Arabic, Rai News 24, 8 November 2005
 US forces 'used chemical weapons' during assault on city of Fallujah, The Independent, 9 November 2005

Cold War aerial bombs of the United States
Aerial bombs of the United States
Incendiary weapons
Iraq War